Vic Lawrence may refer to:

Vic Lawrence (Australian rules footballer), Australian rules footballer for North Melbourne
Vic Lawrence (rugby league), Australian rugby league player for the South Sydney Rabbitohs